The 2006 Challenge Tour was the 18th season of the Challenge Tour, the official development tour to the European Tour. The tour started as the Satellite Tour with its first Order of Merit rankings in 1989 and was officially renamed as the Challenge Tour at the start of the 1990 season.

The Challenge Tour Rankings were won by Wales' Mark Pilkington. Frenchman Adrien Mörk shot the first 59 in the history of the PGA European Tour's three tours at the Tikida Hotels Agadir Moroccan Classic.

Schedule
The following table lists official events during the 2006 season.

Challenge Tour Rankings
For full rankings, see 2006 Challenge Tour graduates.

The rankings were based on prize money won during the season, calculated in Euros. The top 20 players on the tour earned status to play on the 2007 European Tour.

See also
2006 European Tour

Notes

References

External links
Official homepage of the Challenge Tour

Challenge Tour seasons
Challenge Tour